Sataspes ribbei is a species of moth of the family Sphingidae. It was discovered in  Sulawesi, Indonesia.

References

Sataspes (moth)
Moths described in 1885